María Antonia Santos Plata (10 April 1782–28 June 1819), was a Neogranadine peasant, rebel leader and heroine.

She galvanized, organized, and led the rebel guerrillas in the Province of El Socorro against the invading Spanish troops during the Reconquista of the New Granada. She was captured, tried, and found guilty of lese-majesty and high treason. She was sentenced and executed by firing squad.

She is regarded to be the foremost example of the women participating in this conflict. A brigade in the Colombian army was named after her.

References

 Pablo Rodríguez, Historia que no cesa : la independencia de Colombia, 1780-1830, Universidad del Rosario, 2010, 313 p.

1782 births
1819 deaths
Maria Antonia
People from Santander Department
19th-century Colombian people
Women in 19th-century warfare
Colombian independence activists
Executed Colombian people
Executed Colombian women
19th-century executions by Spain
People executed by Spain by firing squad
Women in war in Colombia